Igor Vladimirovich Rasko (born October 7, 1966) is a Russian former professional ice hockey centre.

Rasko played 170 games for Krylya Sovetov Moscow of the Soviet Hockey League from 1981 to 1989. He also played seven games for HC Pardubice of the Czech Extraliga in the 1993–94 season.

Rasko played in the 1985 World Junior Ice Hockey Championships for the Soviet Union, winning a bronze medal.

References

External links

1966 births
Living people
Buran Voronezh players
HC Dynamo Pardubice players
SHK Hodonín players
Kristall Elektrostal players
Krylya Sovetov Moscow players
Russian ice hockey centres
Ice hockey people from Moscow
Soviet ice hockey centres
Wiener EV players
Russian expatriate ice hockey people
Russian expatriate sportspeople in the Czech Republic
Russian expatriate sportspeople in Austria
Expatriate ice hockey players in the Czech Republic
Expatriate ice hockey players in Austria